Ramularia cyclaminicola is a fungal plant pathogen infecting cyclamens.

References

Fungal plant pathogens and diseases
Ornamental plant pathogens and diseases
cyclaminicola
Taxa named by William Trelease